Centerville Municipal Airport  is a city-owned public-use airport located three nautical miles (6 km) southwest of the central business district of Centerville, a city in Appanoose County, Iowa, United States. According to the FAA's National Plan of Integrated Airport Systems for 2009–2013, it is categorized as a general aviation airport.

Although many U.S. airports use the same three-letter location identifier for the FAA and IATA, this airport is assigned TVK by the FAA and no designation from the IATA.

Facilities and aircraft 
It has one runway designated 16/34 with a concrete surface measuring 4,099 by 75 feet (1,249 x 23 m).

For the 12-month period ending July 2, 2008, the airport had 5,750 general aviation aircraft operations, an average of 15 per day. At that time there were 12 aircraft based at this airport: 92% single-engine and 8% multi-engine.

References

External links 
  at Iowa DOT Airport Directory
 Aerial image as of 19 April 1994 from USGS The National Map
 

Airports in Iowa
Transportation buildings and structures in Appanoose County, Iowa